Herman Fredrik Zeiner-Gundersen (4 July 1915, Helsinki – 13 October 2002, Bærum) was a general in the Norwegian Army. He served as Chief of Defence of Norway from 1972 to 1977.

Personal life 
Zeiner-Gundersen was born in Helsinki, which was then part of the Russian Empire,  to ship broker Herman Gundersen and Annette Zeiner-Henriksen, and grew up in Kristiania. He married Marit Pedersen in 1948. He resided at Blommenholm.

Career 
Zeiner-Gundersen was a veteran of World War II. He served as an artillery officer during the Norwegian Campaign in April 1940. After the Norwegian surrender to the Germans, Zeiner-Gundersen traveled in 1941 via Sweden, the Soviet Union and China to Canada. After a stay there he joined the Norwegian military mission in New York. In April 1942 he crossed the Atlantic Ocean to Britain and served with the artillery battery of the Norwegian Brigade in Scotland.

He was Chairman of the NATO Military Committee from 1977 to 1980.

Zeiner-Gundersen was decorated with the Grand Cross of the Royal Norwegian Order of St. Olav in 1977.

References

External links
 

1915 births
2002 deaths
Norwegian Army personnel of World War II
Norwegian Army generals
NATO military personnel
Chiefs of Defence (Norway)